Lanemeyer was a pop punk band from northern New Jersey, United States.

Lanemeyer was formed in 1997.  Taking their name from John Cusack's character (Lane Meyer) in the film Better Off Dead..., Lanemeyer were known for their humor and love of comedy. They broke up in 2001 after touring with bands such as The Lawrence Arms, Bigwig, River City High, Whippersnapper, and many more. After the breakup, several members continued to perform with other bands, such as The Forever Endeavor, The Gaslight Anthem, and Day at the Fair (Rushmore Records). Lanemeyer has reunited several times to play single shows, with varying member lineups.

In 2018 they re-released Stories for the Big Screen on limited Green Vinyl I Surrender Records. This is Rob Hitt from Midtown's record label.

Members 

 Chris Barker (vocals/guitar)
 Mike Doyle (vocals/bass) - Check out his podcast about the late 90s punk scene
 Sean Smith (drums)
 Rob Heiner (guitar)
 Alan Rappaport (vocals/guitar)
 David Patino (drums)
 Andrew Bowman Spratt (guitar)
 Casey Lee Morgan (guitar)
 Brian Fallon (vocals/guitar)

Discography 

 Stories for the Big Screen EP (1999, Red Leader Records) 
 Lanemeyer/Emanuel Nice split (2000)
 If There's a Will, There's Still Nothing (2000, Too Hep Records)
 Songs We Hated The Least (free retrospective compilation CD handed out at their first reunion show)
 Whispering Every Word into a Smile (2006, Top 5/All About Records)

Compilation appearances

 Punk Uprisings: Incompatible, Vol. 1 - song "Me and You on the Big Screen" (Victory Records, 1998)
 Punked Up Love - song "Fuck You And Your Boyfriend"  (VMS Records, 2000)
 Punk Rock Strike: Punk Rock Strikes Back, Vol. 2 - song "Alarm" (Springman Records, 2001)

Related bands 
 Arcade Academy - Mike Doyle
 the Look Away - Sean Smith
 The Gaslight Anthem - Brian Fallon
 This Charming Man - Brian Fallon
 Cincinnati Rail Tie - Brian Fallon, Casey Lee Morgan
 Revolution Summer - Casey Lee Morgan
 The Forever Endeavor - Casey Lee Morgan
 We're All Broken - Casey Lee Morgan

External links 
 Lanemeyer on ARTISTdirect.com

Musical groups established in 1997
Pop punk groups from New Jersey